Jiang Ranxin (born 2 May 2000) is a Chinese sport shooter.

She participated at the 2018 ISSF World Shooting Championships, winning a medal.

She qualified to represent China at the 2020 Summer Olympics. where she won the gold medal in mixed 10 metre air pistol team in the event's debut on the Olympic stage. She also won the bronze medal in women's 10 metre air pistol.

References

External links

Living people
2000 births
Chinese female sport shooters
ISSF pistol shooters
Olympic shooters of China
Olympic gold medalists for China
Olympic bronze medalists for China
Medalists at the 2020 Summer Olympics
Olympic medalists in shooting
Shooters at the 2020 Summer Olympics
21st-century Chinese women